Frank Corby (born 24 December 1924, date of death unknown) was an Australian rules footballer who played with Collingwood in the Victorian Football League (VFL).

Notes

External links 

1924 births
Australian rules footballers from Victoria (Australia)
Collingwood Football Club players
Year of death missing